Martin Long  is a Canadian politician who was elected in the 2019 Alberta general election to the Legislative Assembly of Alberta representing the electoral district of West Yellowhead as a member of the United Conservative Party.

Mr. Long was appointed as the Parliamentary Secretary for Small Business on October 24, 2022, and formerly served as the Parliamentary Secretary for Small Business and Tourism.

As a legislator, Mr. Long has been a member of the Standing Committee on Families and Communities. In addition to this, Mr. Long participated in the Alberta Joint Working Group on MMIWG (Murdered and Missing Indigenous Women and Girls) which resulted in the 113 Pathways to Justice Report.

In his elected position, responsible resource development has been a focus. He chairs the Upper-Smoky Caribou Sub-Regional Task Force and advocates both industry and conservation in his constituency; most notably in relation to the Mountain Pine Beetle.

Mr. Long’s volunteer involvement includes Chairing Tennille's Hope Community Kitchen board of directors for the duration of the year 2019.

Electoral History

References

External Links 
Tennille's Hope – Whitecourt's Community Soup Kitchen 

Statement on Red Dress Day - Province of Alberta. Alberta Hansard, Legislative Assembly of Alberta, 5 May 2022, 1185.

Member Statement on the Joint Working Group on MMIWG - Province of Alberta, Alberta Hansard, Legislative Assembly of Alberta, 25 April 2022.

United Conservative Party MLAs
Living people
Year of birth uncertain
21st-century Canadian politicians
1977 births